Jumbo Jet is a steel roller coaster located at Chelyuskintsev Park in Minsk, Belarus. It originally operated from 1972 to 1978 at Cedar Point in Sandusky, Ohio. The roller coaster is a prefabricated model that features an electric spiral lift mechanism, and it was one of the earliest known coasters to use this lift mechanism.

Ride layout
The Jumbo Jet, like all electric spiral lift roller coasters, reached the top of its lift hill by way of a gently-graded spiraling helix, before beginning its first drop. Unlike many roller coasters, which use a traditional chain lift, the Jumbo Jet was propelled with small wheel motors up the incline of the helix. These sort of coasters soon became a very common type of steel roller coaster in the 1970s, and were distinguished from later steel roller coaster designs that were characterized by their thicker, tubular-steel tracks. After climbing the  spiral lift, riders plunge into a series of tight turns using a figure-eight pattern and ending with a double-helix. When it debuted, Jumbo Jet was billed as the fastest of its kind and was known for its views of Lake Erie and steeply banked turns (some at up to 70 degrees).

History

Jumbo Jet was manufactured by notable roller coaster designer Anton Schwarzkopf, and was the first of the Jet Star 3 model in the Jumbo Jet line. The coaster was located in the same beachfront location where a wooden roller coaster called Cyclone once stood before. It was also the location that housed the now-defunct Disaster Transport, an indoor roller coaster, as well as the location where GateKeeper stands presently. While at Cedar Point, Jumbo Jet carried between 1.6 and 1.8 million passengers every year. Jumbo Jet was eventually replaced in 1979 by the new WildCat coaster. Although Jumbo Jet was only at Cedar Point for a short time, the roller coaster subsequently moved to a number of different amusement parks, including Palace Playland in Maine, Malmö Folkets Park in Sweden, Beoland in Russia, Dreamland in Belarus, and its present location of Chelyuskintsev Park also located in Belarus.

References

External links

 The Lost Coaster, a blog devoted to discovering the ultimate fate of Jumbo Jet
 YouTube video of a Jumbo Jet recreation using the No Limits program